Berlin Schönhauser Allee is a railway station in the Prenzlauer Berg district of Berlin. It is located on the Berlin U-Bahn line  and also on the Ringbahn (Berlin S-Bahn).
Built in 1913 by A.Grenander opened as "Bahnhof Nordring". As the station was well accepted the roof was elongated in 1925 and a new entrance built.
In 1936 the station was named "Schönhauser Allee". On an average day approximately 500 trains and more than 26000 people cross this station.

At this station, the elevated U2 crosses the below-ground S-Bahn, while at the other crossing of the U2 and the Ringbahn, Messe-Nord/ICC S-Bahn station and Kaiserdamm U2 station, the U2 crosses S-Bahn below-ground on the bottom deck of a road bridge.

References

U2 (Berlin U-Bahn) stations
Schonhauser Allee
Schonhauser Allee
Railway stations in Germany opened in 1913